Fusaea is a genus of plants in the family Annonaceae. It comprises three species distributed in Brazil, Colombia, Ecuador, French Guiana, Guyana, Peru, Suriname and Venezuela.

Description
Fusea are shrubs or trees.  Their flowers have a three-lobed calyx that can be separated or almost united.  Their petals are large and covered it silky hairs.  They have an outer row of sterile stamens and fertile inner stamens.  Their leaves are alternate and have smooth margins.  Their fruit are round and smooth and formed from multiple fused carpels.  The fruit has pulpy flesh.

Species
Species include:
 Fusaea decurrens R.E.Fr.
 Fusaea longifolia (Aubl.) Saff.
 Fusaea peruviana R.E.Fr.

References

Annonaceae
Annonaceae genera
Flora of Brazil
Flora of Colombia
Flora of Ecuador
Flora of French Guiana
Flora of Guyana
Flora of Peru
Flora of Suriname
Flora of Venezuela
Taxa named by Henri Ernest Baillon
Taxa named by William Edwin Safford